Nuria Brancaccio (born 24 June 2000) is an Italian tennis player.

Brancaccio has a career-high WTA singles ranking of No. 267, achieved on 3 October 2022. She also has a career-high doubles ranking of world No. 284, reached on 27 June 2022.

Brancaccio has reached five career singles finals on the ITF Circuit, with a record of one win. Additionally, she has reached eight doubles finals (three wins).

Personal life
She has a Spanish mother and an Italian father. Her brother Raúl Brancaccio is also a tennis player.

Tennis career
Brancaccio made her WTA Tour main-draw debut at the 2021 Italian Open in Rome, where she received a wildcard entry, partnering fellow Italian Lucia Bronzetti.

At the Tennis at the 2022 Mediterranean Games, she won the silver medal in singles and the bronze medal in doubles along Aurora Zantedeschi.

WTA 125 tournament finals

Singles: 1 (runner-up)

ITF finals

Singles: 7 (2 titles, 5 runner–ups)

Doubles: 9 (3 titles, 6 runner–ups)

Notes

References

External links
 

2000 births
Living people
Italian female tennis players
Competitors at the 2022 Mediterranean Games
Mediterranean Games silver medalists for Italy
Mediterranean Games bronze medalists for Italy
Mediterranean Games medalists in tennis
Italian people of Spanish descent
21st-century Italian women